Jo Blankenburg is a German composer based in Los Angeles. He writes music for film and motion picture advertising. His primary musical instrument is the piano.

Early life, family and education
Blankenburg was "born and raised in Munich, Germany."

He was trained to play organ.

He has completed a Film Scoring and Orchestration course at Berklee College of Music.

Career

Blankenburg once won the MTV Europe Songwriting Contest.

Some of his most popular tracks have been used in the advertising campaigns of The Hunger Games, Harry Potter and the Deathly Hallows, X-Men: First Class, and How To Train Your Dragon among many others.

A solo album Vendetta was released in 2011 by Position Music. This album's songs of have been used for the advertising campaigns of many major movies and television shows. Another solo album, Elysium, was recorded with Capellen Orchestra & Choir in Zlin, Czech Republic. The album was released in 2012 on Position Music.

Blankenburg's "Fearmonger" from his 2020 album Vanguard was chosen for the Netflix series Shadow & Bone soundtrack.

Personal life
Blankenburg resides in Los Angeles, but has also resided in New York City and Auckland, New Zealand.

Albums

Floatovations
Jo Blankenburg's debut album, Floatovations, published by Zero Latency, was released on January 9, 2007. The album comprised five meditative compositions with an ocean/sea theme.

Vendetta
An album composed by Jo Blankenburg for Position Music, released on March 21, 2011. Its songs were used for major motion advertising campaigns for Harry Potter and the Deathly Hallows, X-Men: First Class and The Twilight Saga: Breaking Dawn among many others.

Elysium
Elysium was released on July 31, 2012 by Position Music, following the success of Vendetta.

Trailer music

 2009 – The Wolfman
 2009 – How To Train Your Dragon
 2009 – FlashForward 
 2011 – "Dystopic" for featurette X-Men: First Class  
 2011 – "Satorius" for TV Spot Harry Potter and the Deathly Hallows 
 2011 – "Conquest of Antaria" for Featurette Harry Potter and the Deathly Hallows 
 2011 – "Juggernaut" and "Satorius" for America's Got Talent 
 2011 – "Vendetta" and "Satorius" for TV Spot The Twilight Saga: Breaking Dawn 
 2011 – "Vendetta" for Home Video Trailer Rise of the Planet of the Apes 
 2011 – "Enamorus" for Far Cry 3
 2012 – "Apophis" for TV Spot The Hunger Games 
 2012 – "Illumielle" for the official Christmas television advert for British department store Debenhams 
 2013 – "Imperatrix Mundi" for 300: Rise of an Empire
 2014 – "Garador's Flight" for ABC News intro music at 05:30 for the switchover from BBC World Service
 2018 - "Hiraeth" for Kingdom Come: Deliverance
 2019 - "Play the Ponies" for Knives Out
 2020 - "The Magellan Matrix" for Wonder Woman 1984

Credits
 2005 – "Shortfilm: The World Beneath" 
 2005 – "Documentary: Ticket"
 2006 – "Documentary: Poetry" 
 2006 – "Feature Film: Stages" 
 2007 – "Music Video: Vahveraasio" 
 2007 – "Shortfilm: Omega99" 
 2007 – "Music Video: Planet Earth Forever" 
 2008 – "Shortfilm: Squalid" 
 2008 – "Four orchestral pieces for Immediate Music 
 2009 – "Music for Congolese opera" 
 2009 – "Theme music for World of Wearable Art 
 2010 – "Demo music for Dr. Grordbort, Weta Workshop (Lord of the Rings)" 
 2011 – "Audio-visual project Oil Spill for Berlin International Film Festival showcase 
 2011 – "Music for documentary The Human Experience" 
 2011 – "Shortfilm: Anamnesis" 
 2011 – "Music for Qtel commercial promoting the 2011 World of Wearable Art

Discography
 2007 – Floatovations (solo album)
 2008 – The Feather Dance (solo album)
 2008 – Squalid (Original Motion Picture Soundtrack)
 2010 – Vendetta (Position Music)
 2011 – The Human Experience (Grassroots Films)
 2012 – Elysium (Position Music)
 2012 – The Rebirth (single)
 2015 – Kaleidoscope (Position Music)
 2016 – Valkyrie (Position Music)
 2017 – Cronos (Position Music)
 2018 – Clandestine (Position Music)
 2018 – Cosmagora (Position Music)
 2018 – Stillness Speaks (solo album)
 2019 – Rakasha (solo album)
 2019 – Petrichor (Position Music)
 2019 – Sacrosanct (Position Music)
 2019 – Eleomera (Position Music)
 2020 – Vanguard (Position Music)
 2020 – Hemispheres (Position Music)
 2020 – Mile X Mile (Position Music)
 2020 – Ghost in the Machine (Position Music)
 2020 – Vandals (Position Music)
 2021 – Memoirs (Position Music)
 2021 – Sentience (Position Music)
 2021 – Unravel (Position Music)
 2022 – The World Is Waiting (Position Music)
 2022 – Clandestine II: Vespertine (Position Music)
 2022 – Clandestine III: Emanence (Position Music)
 2023 – Rust (Position Music)

See also 
 Trailer music

References

External links 
Official website
Profile at bandcamp.com

Year of birth missing (living people)
Living people
German composers